The Logan Formation is the name given to a Lower Carboniferous (early Osagean) siltstone, sandstone and conglomeratic unit exposed in east-central Ohio and parts of western West Virginia, USA.

Stratigraphy and paleoenvironment

The Logan Formation was named by Andrews (1870) and originally described as a "buff-colored, fine-grained sandstone" above the Waverly Formation and below the Maxville Limestone. Bork and Malcuit (1979) concluded that the Logan Formation was deposited on a shallow marine shelf in a generally transgressing sea. The age of the Logan Formation has been established as early Osagean (Tn3) by the occurrences of brachiopods, ammonoids, conodonts and miospores (Clayton et al., 1998; Matchen and Kammer, 2006).

References

Mississippian United States
Carboniferous Indiana
Carboniferous Ohio
Carboniferous West Virginia
Carboniferous southern paleotropical deposits